Abeed or abīd (plural of ʿabd), is an Arabic word meaning "servant" or "slave". The term is used sometimes in the Arab world as an ethnic slur for Black people, and dates back to the Arab slave trade. In recent decades, usage of the word has become controversial due to its racist connotations and origins, particularly among the Arab diaspora.

Usage

Usage in Sudan
In North Sudan, the terms "Abeed" and "Abid" are commonly used to refer to South Sudanese people (mostly Dinka and Nuer), who are considered by many North Sudanese as a "slave tribe" due to their enslavement during the trans-Saharan slave trade. Usage of the terms in North Sudan is considered derogatory in nature and has fallen into relative disuse in recent decades. In South Sudan, people from North Sudan are in turn referred to derogatorily as "Mundukuru" (meaning untrustworthy) and "Minga". However, Ugandan historian Mahmood Mamdani has noted that the north–south ethnic conflict in Sudan does not reflect Western preconceptions of "race" and the Western view of the conflict as a conflict between  "Arabs" and "Black Africans" is simplistic and inaccurate.

South Sudanese politician Francis Deng framed an allegorical microcosm of British rule in Sudan as Britain stating to the North Sudanese that "You Northerners are slave traders and you treat the Southerners like Abeed. Don't call them Abeed! They are slaves no longer."

South Sudanese scholar Jok Madut Jok has argued that slavery in Sudan remains widespread in the 21st century despite being ostensibly outlawed on paper, claiming that South Sudanese people who work in North Sudan in low-paying working class jobs are regarded as "Abeed" due to the social standing which is gained from being in such occupations. Jok noted that South Sudanese labourers who only make enough money to feed themselves are commonly treated as the property of North Sudanese landowners and merchants. According to him, "Displaced Southerners are at the bottom of the racial hierarchy in Northern Sudan", as they depend upon patronage and exploitative relationships with power brokers, with relations ranging from servitude through bonded work to serving as attractants for resources from foreign aid agencies. "The lines dividing slavery and cheap labor", as he writes, "are blurred."

See also
List of ethnic slurs

References 

Anti-African and anti-black slurs
Anti-black racism in Africa
Anti-black racism in Asia
Racism in the Arab world
Stereotypes of black people
Slavery
Society of Sudan
Slavery in Sudan
Islam and slavery